Yuri Stetsenko (sometimes listed as Yuriy Zhetchenko, born 11 April 1945) is a Soviet-born Ukrainian sprint canoeist who competed in the late 1960s and early 1970s. Competing in two Summer Olympics, he won a gold medal in the K-4 1000 m event at Munich in 1972.

Stetsenko also won four medals at the ICF Canoe Sprint World Championships with three golds (K-2 1000 m: 1966, K-4 1000 m: 1970, 1971) and a bronze (K-4 1000 m: 1966).

References

External links
 
 

1945 births
Living people
Soviet male canoeists
Russian male canoeists
Ukrainian male canoeists
Olympic canoeists of the Soviet Union
Olympic gold medalists for the Soviet Union
Olympic medalists in canoeing
Canoeists at the 1968 Summer Olympics
Canoeists at the 1972 Summer Olympics
Medalists at the 1972 Summer Olympics
ICF Canoe Sprint World Championships medalists in kayak
Sportspeople from Kyiv